General elections were held in Trinidad and Tobago on 24 May 1971. The result was a victory for the People's National Movement, which won all 36 seats. Due to a boycott by all major opposition parties protesting at fraud related to the voting machines used in previous elections, voter turnout was just 33.2%.

Results

References

Trinidad
Elections in Trinidad and Tobago
1971 in Trinidad and Tobago